The year 1666 in science and technology involved some significant events.

Events
 December 22 – French Academy of Sciences first meets.

Astronomy
 Publication of Stanisław Lubieniecki's Theatrum Cometicum begins in Amsterdam, the first encyclopedia and atlas of comets.

Botany
 Establishment of Herrenhäuser Gärten, Hanover.

Mathematics
 Isaac Newton develops differential calculus.
 Samuel Morland produces several designs of pocket calculating machine and also publishes A New Method of Cryptography.

Physics
 Isaac Newton uses a prism to split sunlight into the component colours of the optical spectrum, assisting understanding of the nature of light.
 Robert Hooke and Giovanni Alfonso Borelli both expound gravitation as an attractive force (Hooke's lecture "On gravity" at the Royal Society of London on March 21; Borelli's Theoricae Mediceorum planetarum ex causis physicis deductae, published in Florence later in the year).

Publications
 Margaret Cavendish, Duchess of Newcastle-upon-Tyne, publishes Observations upon Experimental Philosophy, including an attack on Robert Hooke's Micrographia.

Births
 December – Stephen Gray, English scientist (died 1736)

Deaths
 Giovanni Battista Baliani, Genoese physicist (born 1582)
 Song Yingxing, Chinese encyclopedist (born 1587)

References

 
17th century in science
1660s in science